Qaisrani is a Baloch clan of the Rind tribe. They live mostly in Balochistan.

Tribal tradition
According to the Baloch tribal traditions, elder son of the deceased tribal chief becomes the head of his tribe after his death. So in the presence of chiefs of the other Baloch tribes at Kot Qaisrani, the base of Qaisrani tribe, Sardar Manzur Ahmad Qaisrani was chosen the new tribal chief.Sardar Manzur Qaisrani died and his son Sardar Zahoor Khan became chief of tribe. Later in 2002, Sardar Zahoor Khan's son Sardar Meer Badshah khan chosen as new chief after the death of Sardar Zahoor Khan.

References

Surnames
Baloch tribes
Saraiki tribes